The Curtiss Model 54 Tanager was an aircraft constructed in 1929 as Curtiss' entry in the Guggenheim Safe Aircraft Competition.

Design and development
The Model 54 was a conventional biplane design with a highly streamlined fuselage similar in outline to the Curtiss Eagle, but of considerably smaller proportions. The wings were fitted with a variety of high-lift devices, including automatic leading edge slots on the upper wing, flaps that extended along the entire span of the upper wing, and "floating" ailerons on the lower wing that, in the absence of pilot input, automatically adjusted themselves parallel to the airflow over the wing. The combination of these devices gave the Tanager a stalling speed of just 31 mph (50 km/h) and allowed it to land in only 90 ft (27 m).

Only the Tanager and the Handley Page Gugnunc passed the qualifying round of the competition, and ultimately the Tanager beat its rival by only one point to claim the $100,000 (£20,000) prize, since the Gugnunc failed to achieve a minimum speed below 38 mph. Even before the competition was decided, however, Handley Page was suing Curtiss for the unlicensed use of the leading-edge slot. Curtiss claimed they were using the slots experimentally and would apply for a license for any commercial use. Curtiss counter-sued Handley Page for infringements of six of their patents in the Handley Page machine. They also cited a ruling that the British machine was not permitted to be imported into the US.

Following the competition, the Tanager was destroyed in a fire when sparks from its engine set the grass alight.

Specifications

See also

References

Bibliography
 
 
 Time 6 January 1930

External links

First announcement of competitors Flight 1927
Flight 16 June 1927 THE DANIEL GUGGENHEIM SAFE-AIRCRAFT COMPETITION
"Wings For All Of Us", October 1930, Popular Mechanics detailed illustration Tanager's safety low speed and short take off and landing ability
"Hundred-Thousand Dollar Plane - Why it Won" Popular Mechanics, March 1930 detailed text article and excellent photo of Tanager
"AMERICAN PLANE WINS $100,000 SAFETY PRIZE", 1930 News film
The Curtiss Tanager – AOPA Pilot

1920s United States experimental aircraft
Tanager
Single-engined tractor aircraft
Biplanes
Aircraft first flown in 1929